CSS Missouri was a casemate ironclad built by the Confederate States Navy during the American Civil War.  Her propulsion machinery was taken from an existing steamboat, her armor was railroad T-rails, and she was armed with three captured cannon. She was difficult to steer and leaked badly. Additional equipment had to be added to bring allow her to reach her intended speed. Completed during 1863 on the Red River, she was trapped in the Shreveport, Louisiana, area by low water and never saw combat.  The vessel's crew had desertion issues and some of her crewmen were pulled from the army. After traveling downriver for the first time, the ship was surrendered in June 1865 to the United States Navy—the last Confederate ironclad to be handed over—and sold in November.

Description
It partially enclosed her  diameter stern paddle wheel in a recess at the aft end of the casemate; the upper  of the paddle wheel protruded above the casemate and was totally unprotected. 

The ship's propulsion machinery was taken from either the steamboats Grand Era or T. W. Roberts. Other machinery was taken from the supply vessel CSS Paul Jones. During her initial sea trials on 17 June 1863, she had a maximum speed of  going upstream only half the speed  as had been promised. After the installation of a donkey engine to power a  fan, the bilge pumps and a capstan a few months later, she reached a speed of  against a  current.

Missouris armor consisted of  railroad T-rails, laid alternately with the crowns up and down. On the sides of the ship, they were laid diagonally, but were vertical on the bow and stern faces of the casemate. The casemate was sloped at an angle of 30°. The deck fore and aft of the casemate was also protected by T-rails. She was built of green timber, caulked with cotton and was riddled with leaks; the leaking was largely due to the use of the green timber. Despite her three rudders, her stern wheel made her difficult to steer.

The casemate had eight gun ports, two in the bow face and three on each side, although only three guns were mounted in the ship. A smoothbore  Dahlgren pivot gun was mounted in the starboard forward position. It could fire out of the starboard bow port or the forward starboard broadside port. An old 32-pounder (14.5 kg) siege gun was in the equivalent position on the port side of the ship. The characteristics of this gun cannot be reliably determined because the United States produced a multitude of 32-pounder guns before the Civil War, but none of them were designated as siege guns. The third gun was a smoothbore  Dahlgren pivot gun that could fire out of either of the two aft broadside gun ports. The two Dahlgren guns had been salvaged from the wreck of the Union ironclad USS Indianola and the 32-pounder piece was likely captured from the Gosport Navy Yard. No guns were provided for the two center broadside gun ports. Different cannons were originally slated to be assigned to Missouri, but those were intercepted by John C. Pemberton for use in the defenses of the Mississippi cities of Vicksburg and Grand Gulf.

Construction and service
The Confederate Navy Department authorized the construction of one or more ironclad warships at Shreveport on 3 October 1862 and Lieutenant Jonathan H. Carter contracted for two ships on 1 November. One contract was placed with riverboat captains Thomas Moore and John Smoker for one ironclad, with the other being awarded to George Fitch; the Fitch ironclad project was postponed in favor of the other and was eventually canceled. No complete blueprint of the ship is known to survive, but it is believed that she was designed by Chief Naval Constructor John L. Porter. The contract with Moore and Smoker specified a cost of $336,500 to be paid in installments. The keel of the first ship was laid in December and she was launched on 14 April 1863. By June, she was complete enough for a trial run. The ship was turned over to the Confederate Navy on 12 September 1863 and commissioned a week later after the high-water season on the Red River had ended, although she did not receive her guns until between November 1863 and March 1864. Carter proposed to name the vessel Caddo after a Native American tribe, but it was instead decided to name her Missouri after the state and its erstwhile Confederate government. First Lieutenant Charles Fauntleroy was appointed as her captain, although he told Carter that "he hoped the damned boat would sink" and that he "never intended to serve on her if he could help it". He desired a command on a ocean-going vessel, rather than his assignment to the inland ironclad. Fauntleroy was transferred in July to command a blockade runner, and Carter, who had previously commanded the gunboat CSS General Polk and was in Shreveport on direct orders from Confederate States Secretary of the Navy Stephen R. Mallory, was placed in command. Much of Missouris crew was transferred from CSS Harriet Lane, while others were taken from the army.  In mid-December 1863, Carter requested 72 crewmen, a blacksmith, and a carpenter for Missouri.  Crew conditions on the ironclad were unpleasant, and the ship's crew was plagued by desertions among the army men. Low water prevented Missouri from playing any part in the Red River Campaign of early 1864.  Her movements were also hampered by a lack of fuel. In September, Carter commanded an unsuccessful attempt to seize the Federal gunboat  using men from the crews of Missouri and CSS Webb.

In March 1865, the river began to rise and Missouri was able to leave the Shreveport area for the first time. She reached Alexandria, Louisiana, on 8 April and anchored where she could defend the town. In order to travel to Alexandria, fuel for the vessel had to be requisitioned from plantations along the way. Part of her crew was then transferred to Webb, which made an unsuccessful attempt to escape into the Gulf of Mexico on April 23. Carter surrendered the ship to Union forces on 3 June, the last Confederate ironclad to surrender. After her armor was removed, Missouri was sold at public auction on 29 November at Mound City, Illinois to be scrapped.

Notes

Citations

Bibliography

External links
United States Naval Historical Center - CSS Missouri
CSS Missouri on www.irononthered.com

Ironclad warships of the Confederate States Navy
1863 ships
Ships built in Louisiana
Paddle steamers of the United States